The 1985 Calder Cup playoffs of the American Hockey League began on April 10, 1985. The eight teams that qualified, four from each division, played best-of-seven series for Division Semifinals and Division Finals. The division champions played a best-of-seven series for the Calder Cup.  The Calder Cup Final ended on May 24, 1985, with the Sherbrooke Canadiens defeating the Baltimore Skipjacks four games to two to win the Calder Cup for the only time in team history. Sherbrooke's Brian Skrudland won the Jack A. Butterfield Trophy as AHL playoff MVP.

The Maine Mariners set an AHL playoff record during the Northern division final against Sherbrooke by scoring three goals 23 seconds apart. Maine scored at 19:29, 19:42, and 19:52 of the second period in the game, thereby setting a new AHL playoff record for the three fastest goals scored.

Playoff seeds
After the 1984–85 AHL regular season, the top four teams from each division qualified for the playoffs. The Binghamton Whalers finished the regular season with the best overall record.

Northern Division
Maine Mariners - 86 points
Fredericton Express - 80 points
Sherbrooke Canadiens - 79 points
Nova Scotia Oilers - 79 points

Southern Division
Binghamton Whalers - 112 points
Baltimore Skipjacks - 98 points
Rochester Americans - 93 points
Springfield Indians - 76 points

Bracket

In each round, the team that earned more points during the regular season receives home ice advantage, meaning they receive the "extra" game on home-ice if the series reaches the maximum number of games. There is no set series format due to arena scheduling conflicts and travel considerations.

Division Semifinals
Note: Home team is listed first.

Northern Division

(1) Maine Mariners vs. (4) Nova Scotia Oilers

(2) Fredericton Express vs. (3) Sherbrooke Canadiens

Southern Division

(1) Binghamton Whalers vs. (4) Springfield Indians

(2) Baltimore Skipjacks vs. (3) Rochester Americans

Division Finals

Northern Division

(1) Maine Mariners vs. (3) Sherbrooke Canadiens

Southern Division

(1) Binghamton Whalers vs. (2) Baltimore Skipjacks

Calder Cup Final

(S2) Baltimore Skipjacks vs.(N3) Sherbrooke Canadiens

See also
1984–85 AHL season
List of AHL seasons

References

Calder Cup
Calder Cup playoffs